Euskelosaurus ("good leg lizard") is a sauropodomorph dinosaur from the Late Triassic of South Africa and Lesotho. Fossils have only been recovered from the lower Elliot Formation in South Africa and Lesotho, and in one locality in Zimbabwe.

History of discovery

In 1863, Alfred Brown recovered fossil material consisting of limb bones and vertebrae, in the lower Elliot Formation in the southeastern Free State. In 1866, Thomas Henry Huxley first described Euskelosaurus from Brown's fossil material, and named the holotype specimen Euskelosaurus brownii after Brown. Harry Seeley later described Euskelosaurus in 1894, as did Friedrich von Huene in 1902. Since then, other researchers, including Robert Broom, have mentioned Euskelosaurus in their papers, although later papers refer to the material under the name Plateosauravus.

Description

Euskelosaurus is considered to have been a large, robust member of the sauropodomorph clade. With such parameters it was the largest of the non-sauropod ("prosauropod") sauropodomorphs. Its bones are robust and it had a graviportal limb arrangement, a key character trait of basal sauropodomorphs.

Classification
While paleontologists generally consider Euskelosaurus a basal plateosaurid sauropodomorph, it has recently been considered a nomen dubium and a “waste-basket” taxon with poorly understood phylogenetic relationships, warranting further study.

References

Plateosauridae
Late Triassic dinosaurs of Africa
Paleontology in Lesotho
Fossils of South Africa
Fossils of Zimbabwe
Fossil taxa described in 1866
Taxa named by Thomas Henry Huxley